Josh Emett is a chef from New Zealand. He is co-owner of Onslow restaurant at 9  Princes st Auckland and The Oyster Inn on Waiheke Island with his wife Helen. He is the co-founder of  Rata restaurant in Queenstown and restaurant chain Go-To Collection which includes Madam Woo, and Hawker and Roll. Emett worked for Gordon Ramsay for over 10 years, and has been a judge on MasterChef New Zealand.

Early life 
Emett grew up on a farm outside of Hamilton, New Zealand. He completed his chef training at Waikato Polytechnic Catering School.

Career 
After finishing his studies Emett worked for a short time in Auckland, New Zealand at Cin Cin on Quay before setting off overseas, where he worked at Coast restaurant in Mayfair, London, with Steven Terry. His next move took him to Australia where he worked at one of Melbourne’s most highly regarded restaurants, Est Est Est under Donovan Cooke.

In 1999 he headed to South France, where he worked on luxury yachts. He then moved to London and made contact with Gordon Ramsay, whom Cooke had introduced him to. He went on to work with Ramsay for ten years at Restaurant Gordon Ramsay, Claridge’s and the Savoy Grill in London, and then overseas to New York, Los Angeles and Melbourne.

In 2011 Emett left Gordon Ramsay Holdings and opened his first restaurant, Rata, in Queenstown with his business partner Fleur Caulton. A few years later they opened Madam Woo, a casual Malaysian restaurant also in Queenstown. Its huge success has seen them open three more outposts since. In 2017 Emett’s team diversified and opened Hawker and Roll, a fast casual spin-off of Madam Woo which now has three sites across New Zealand.

In 2013 Emett was appointed food director at Ostro, a stylish high-end brasserie in Auckland’s Britomart district.

In 2019, Madam Woo in Dunedin closed due to ongoing labour shortages, and in May 2020 the Christchurch location closed due to financial viability concerns during the COVID-19 outbreak.

Brand Ambassador 
Emett has been an ambassador for BMW since 2012 and Nespresso since 2017. He is also the Strategic Advisor for food and beverage at Craggy Range.

Television Appearances 
Emett was a judge for five seasons of MasterChef New Zealand and a guest chef on MasterChef Australia. He also appeared in season one of Chopped USA and on Hell’s Kitchen as a guest chef.

Awards 

StarChefs New York Rising Star, 2009 – Hotel Chef.

Books 
Cut (2013), Penguin Random House

Josh’s Backyard BBQ (2014), Penguin Random House

The Recipe (2019), Rizzoli New York, Hardie Grant Australia, and Upstart Press.

Personal life 
Emett lives in Kohimarama, Auckland, New Zealand, with his wife Helen and two sons, Finn and Louis.

References

External links
 
 Presentation at Rata
 

New Zealand chefs
Living people
New Zealand restaurateurs
1973 births